Vüqar Arshad oglu Nadirov (born 15 June 1987 in Ağdam) is an Azerbaijani footballer, who last played for Sabail FK.

Career

Club
Nadirov left FK Qarabağ in June 2015 after six years with the club, going on to rejoin FK Khazar Lankaran later in the month.

In December 2015, Nadirov left Gabala after six-months with the club, during which he failed to make a first team appearance.

On 27 May 2016, Nadirov left Inter Baku after six-months with the club.

On 14 July 2016, Nadirov signed a one-year contract with Qarabağ FK.

Nadirov was released by Sabail FK at the end of the 2017–18 season.

International career
Nadirov made his Azerbaijan debut on 12 February 2004, against Israel during friendly match, which made him young player ever to play for Azerbaijan until 2008.

Career statistics

Club

International

Statistics accurate as of match played 3 September 2015

International goals

Personal life
His father died in the First Nagorno-Karabakh War.

Honours
Khazar Lankaran
Azerbaijan Premier League (1): 2006–07
Azerbaijan Cup (1): 2006–07

Qarabağ
Azerbaijan Premier League (3): 2013–14, 2014–15, 2016–17
 Azerbaijan Cup (1): 2014–15

Footnotes

External links

1987 births
Living people
Azerbaijani footballers
Azerbaijan international footballers
Azerbaijan under-21 international footballers
Association football forwards
Khazar Lankaran FK players
Qarabağ FK players
FK Masallı players
Gabala FC players
Sabail FK players
Azerbaijan Premier League players
People from Agdam
Footballers from Agdam